Jalal Khan refers to:
Jalal Khan, a legendary figure in the history of Balochistan
 Jalal Khan, Balochistan, a town in Pakistan
 Jalal Khan (athlete) (born 1927), a Pakistani javelin thrower